C'mon! is the second studio album by American country music artist Keith Anderson. The album was released by Columbia Nashville on August 5, 2008. It features the singles "Sunday Morning in America" and "I Still Miss You," the latter of which reached the Top 5 on the Billboard Hot Country Songs chart in August 2008. The third single "Somebody Needs A Hug" failed to reach top 40, peaking at #46. His next single "She Could've Been Mine" was released in January 2009, and it was even less successful, peaking at No. 56. Ten of the album's eleven songs were co-written by Anderson.

Radney Foster and Bill Lloyd, who comprised the 1980s duo Foster & Lloyd, appear on the track "Crazy Over You." The song is a cover of their debut single from 1987, which was a Top 5 country hit that year. "Lost in This Moment," co-written by Anderson, was a Number One single for the duo Big & Rich in 2007.

Track listing

Personnel
Keith Anderson - lead vocals, acoustic guitar
Larry Beaird - acoustic guitar
Pat Buchanan - electric guitar
Tom Bukovac - electric guitar
Eric Darken - percussion
Joanna Cotten - background vocals
David Lee Murphy - background vocals
Kenny Greenberg - electric guitar
Tony Harrell - piano
Bob Hatter - talkbox guitar, background vocals
Steve Hinson - lap steel guitar, pedal steel guitar
Mike Johnson - pedal steel guitar
Troy Lancaster - electric guitar
Chris McHugh - drums
Chip Matthews - Ebow, acoustic guitar, background vocals
Greg Morrow - drums
Danny Myrick - background vocals
Russ Pahl - pedal steel guitar
Bobby Pinson - acoustic guitar
Michael Rhodes - bass guitar
Phil "Pretty Boy" Sanders - background vocals
Jeffrey Steele - background vocals
Glenn Worf - bass guitar

Chart performance

Weekly charts

Year-end charts

Singles

See also
2008 in music

References

2008 albums
Keith Anderson albums
Columbia Records albums